Drehkreuz Airport is a German television series.

See also
List of German television series

External links
 

2001 German television series debuts
2001 German television series endings
Aviation television series
German-language television shows
ZDF original programming